The New Democratic Party of Ontario (NDP) fielded a full slate of candidates in the 1990 provincial election, and won a majority government with 74 out of 130 seats.  Many candidates have their own biography pages; information about others may be found here.

Dave Kappele (St. Catharines)
In May 1990, Kappele led a demonstration to support a group of protestors who were arrested for blocking a logging site in Temagami. (Toronto Star, May 11, 1990).  He received 10,629 votes (35.63%) in the 1990 election, finishing a close second against Liberal incumbent Jim Bradley.  After the election, he worked for NDP Member of Provincial Parliament Ron Hansen.

As of 2005, there is a Dave Kappele working as director of services at the Parkdale Community Health Centre in Toronto. (Toronto Star, July 22, 2005)

On May 5, 2007, Dave Kappele died suddenly and unexpectedly.

1990